Rodolfo Macías Fattoruso (born in 1953 in Montevideo, Uruguay) is a literary critic and editor. He has worked as a literary critic since 1976.

He writes in Búsqueda, a Montevidean weekly newspaper and teaches classic literature and philosophy in his Cultural Workshop. He specialized in philosophic aspects of Jorge Luis Borges’s works.

He has been an advisor to Presidents Julio María Sanguinetti and Jorge Batlle. In 2006-2007 he was spokesperson of the Uruguayan Military Circle.

He founded a publishing company called Artemisa Editores.

Books
Francia-Uruguay. Historia de sus Confluencias (1988)
Los Seres Queridos ( Editorial Fin de Siglo, 1998).
De William Shakespeare No Se Puede Hablar. Meditaciones Sobre el Poder (Artemisa Editores, 2008).

References

External links
Artemisa Editores website
President Batlle and writer Fattoruso speaking about Alberdi (in Spanish)

 Fattoruso presenting the book "Sionism: 100 years after Herzl" (in Spanish)

Uruguayan literary critics
Uruguayan essayists
1953 births
People from Montevideo
Living people
Book editors